The 2019 Nadeshiko League was the 31st season of Japan's women's association football highest division league.

Nadeshiko League Division 1
The season started on 21 March 2019 and was completed on 3 November 2019 with the play-offs on 10 November 2019 and 16 November 2019. NTV Beleza won their 14th and their 5th consecutive title.

Teams 
10 teams contested the league, nine teams from the previous season and one promoted team, Iga FC Kunoichi. Nittaidai was able to defeat Nippatsu Yokohama FC Seagulls at the play-offs and thus remained in the league.

Location of teams

League table

Results

Statistics

Topscorers
Updated to matches played on 3 November 2020

Awards

Best XI

References

External links
Nadeshiko League 2019 at Soccerway

Nadeshiko League seasons
1
L
Japan
Japan